Stephen Nathan Stupar (born March 14, 1988) is a former American football linebacker. Stupar was drafted by the Oakland Raiders in the seventh round of the 2012 NFL Draft. He played college football for Penn State.

College career
A native of State College, Pennsylvania, Stupar played at Penn State, where he appeared in 52 games (16 starts) and registered 205 tackles, five sacks, four interceptions, two fumble recoveries, one forced fumble and 12 passes defensed, in his career.

Professional career

Oakland Raiders
Stupar was drafted in the 7th round of the 2012 NFL Draft.  He later signed to the team’s practice squad following training camp and later released on September 12, 2012.

Philadelphia Eagles
Stupar then signed with the Philadelphia Eagles practice squad on November 19, 2012, and spent the remainder of the regular season with the Eagles.

San Francisco 49ers
He was signed to the practice squad of the San Francisco 49ers on January 8, 2013.
Stupar was released by the 49ers on November 2, 2013.

Jacksonville Jaguars
On November 4, 2013, the Jacksonville Jaguars were awarded Stupar on waivers.

On August 30, 2014, he was released on the final cuts. He had led the Jaguars in tackles during the preseason but was cut in lieu of J. T. Thomas, who is more multi-dimensional and able to play both special teams and all three linebacker positions.

Atlanta Falcons
On August 31, 2014, the Atlanta Falcons signed Stupar. The Falcons added him to the 53-man roster. 

On March 3, 2015, Stupar signed a one-year contract extension with the Falcons. In Week 4 of the 2015 season against the Houston Texans, Stupar scored his first touchdown off a fumble recovery on the last play of the game.

New Orleans Saints
On March 16, 2016, Stupar signed a three-year, $5 million contract with the New Orleans Saints.

On October 17, 2017, Stupar was placed on injured reserve after tearing his ACL in Week 6.

On September 3, 2018, Stupar was released by the Saints.

New York Giants 
On September 5, 2018, Stupar signed with the New York Giants.

On March 20, 2019, Stupar re-signed with the Giants. He was released on September 6, 2019. Stupar filed an injury grievance against the Giants, and reached an amicable settlement with the team.  He was re-signed on September 24, 2019. He was released on October 14.

Personal life
Stupar’s older brother, Jonathan, is an American football tight end, who played for the Buffalo Bills from 2009 to 2010. His uncle is retired NFL quarterback and Super Bowl champion, Jeff Hostetler.

Stupar is currently the VP of BD/M for R.H. Marcon, Inc. in State College, PA.

References

External links
Official website
New Orleans Saints bio
Penn State Nittany Lions bio

1988 births
American football linebackers
Atlanta Falcons players
Jacksonville Jaguars players
Living people
New Orleans Saints players
New York Giants players
Oakland Raiders players
Penn State Nittany Lions football players
People from State College, Pennsylvania
Philadelphia Eagles players
Players of American football from Pennsylvania
San Francisco 49ers players